Cornelius Grant (born April 27, 1943) is an American guitarist, composer, and band leader. He served as the musical director, guitar player, and live show arranger for Motown vocal group The Temptations from 1964 until 1982.

Early life
Grant was born in Fairfield, Texas, United States. Raised by his grandmother, whom he adored, he taught himself how to play guitar at the age of nine.

Discovery
When he was 13, his family moved to Detroit. At 15, he was playing in clubs, bars, talent shows, and other functions. Within three years he was playing with Mary Wells, then Marvin Gaye before The Temptations employed him.

Compositions
Grant used a Gibson Birdland and a Fender Telecaster. He created the opening guitar riff on "I Know I'm Losing You". He wrote the hit song with Eddie Holland and Norman Whitfield. He also wrote "You're My Everything" with Roger Penzabene and Norman Whitfield. Penzabene, a close friend of Grant's, wrote "I Wish It Would Rain" and "I Could Never Love Another".

Grant also wrote "Take Me in Your Arms and Love Me" and "Ain't No Sun (Since You Been Gone)" (performed by Gladys Knight & the Pips); "You Got to Earn It", and "I Gotta Find A Way (To Get You Back)" (performed by the Temptations); and "My Weakness Is You" and "I Want My Baby Back" (performed by Edwin Starr); Grant also co-wrote "I'm More Than Happy (I'm Satisfied)" for Stevie Wonder, and "Love and Affection" for Marvin Gaye.

Performances
With The Temptations he had a chance to play to fans in the Pacific, the Caribbean, Europe, the Middle East, and Africa. They were guests at the White House courtesy of President Richard Nixon. Grant also met Martin Luther King Jr., Julie Nixon Eisenhower, Jesse Jackson, Elton John, and The Beatles, and appeared on many television shows.

Grant played on select Motown studio sessions' with the Funk Brothers from 1964 to 1970, including Gladys Knight & the Pips "I Heard It Through the Grapevine". As a rule, Grant played on all the sessions that featured songs he wrote or co-wrote, except one, "You Got to Earn It", which Smokey Robinson cut while Grant was on the road with the Temptations.

Other activities
In 1983, Grant began writing for The Hollywood Reporter and contributed extensively to BRE Magazine as a columnist. A current project, "Flashbacks and Newtraks” is a radio show featuring interviews, entertainment news, oldies music, and many points of view by him and his co-host Sylkie Green.

When Grant gives lectures, he sometimes shares the podium with Motown insiders such as Don Foster (former Supremes and Temptations manager) and TV writer/Motown historian, Ruth Adkins Robinson.

References

External links 
 Cornelius Grant's official website
 
 
 

1943 births
African-American male singers
American male singers
American soul musicians
The Temptations members
Singers from Texas
Living people
People from Fairfield, Texas
American rhythm and blues guitarists
Songwriters from Texas
American bandleaders
American soul guitarists
Lead guitarists
Guitarists from Detroit
Guitarists from Texas
American male guitarists
20th-century American guitarists
African-American songwriters
African-American guitarists